Lee Ha-na (born September 23, 1982) is a South Korean actress. Lee made her acting debut with Alone in Love (2006). She is best known for her role as Kang Kwon-joo in the multiple seasons-procedural thriller Voice (2017–present).

Early life
Lee Ha-na was born in Irwon bon-dong, Gangnam District, Seoul. Her father  is a composer, best known for folk-rock legend Kim Kwang-seok's signature song "Become Dust".

In 2008, she graduated from the College of Music at Dankook University (Cheonan campus) with a degree in Life Musicology.

Career
Lee Ha-na first appeared in a commercial for telecom KTF's "umbrella service"  in 2005. A year later, she made a memorable acting debut in the critically acclaimed television drama Alone in Love, as the extremely odd younger sister of the female protagonist.

She played another supporting role as a small-time swindler in When Spring Comes in 2007. Later that year, Lee was cast in her first leading role in Merry Mary (also known as Me-ri vs. Dae-gu's Attack and Defense Battle), a quirky romance between a mediocre singer and a failed novelist. This was followed by her big screen debut in Le Grand Chef, a film adaptation of Huh Young-man's manhwa Sikgaek, in which Lee played a TV producer who teams up with an aspiring chef.

Unlike her previous cheerful roles, Lee surprised critics and audiences in 2008 when she played a darker character in Women in the Sun (also known as Sisters in Love). In the melodrama, her character wreaks revenge when she learns that her older adopted sister abandoned her (when she was a five-year-old child) at a train station out of jealousy, causing her to grow up impoverished in an orphanage. Lee won an Excellence Award at the year-end KBS Drama Awards.

From November 21, 2008 to April 17, 2009, she was the host/MC of the live music program Lee Ha-na's Peppermint. Before she turned to acting, Lee had early aspirations of becoming a singer, so aside from introducing and interviewing guests, she frequently performed on the show, sometimes accompanying herself on the guitar or piano.

Lee then underwent training for her role as a figure skating coach in Triple, who finds herself in a love triangle with her ex-husband and his best friend who pursues her.

In 2010, Lee was cast opposite veteran actor Ahn Sung-ki in Shin Yeon-shick's film The Fair Love. She played a role of college student who after her father's death, embarks on an awkward yet endearing love affair with his friend, a bachelor in his fifties. This was followed in 2012 by the aviation action film R2B: Return to Base, a remake of Shin Sang-ok's 1964 film Red Scarf.

After a five-year absence from the small screen, Lee returned in High School King of Savvy, a 2014 cable romantic comedy about a high school student who masquerades as an executive at his brother's IT company; she played a temp who shows him the ropes.

In 2015, Lee was cast in the film Journalist, about the ruthless and at times unethical world of news reporting. In the same year, she also starred in KBS2's family-romance Unkind Ladies.

In 2017, Lee starred in OCN's drama Voice as a policewoman with an enhanced sense of hearing. The drama was a hit, and its ratings broke existing OCN viewership records when it aired in Korea. She then filmed comedy film Summer Vacation.

In 2018, Lee reprised her role in Voice 2, the sequel to OCN's drama Voice. Despite the shorter run, Voice 2 surpassed the first season's ratings and eventually became the highest-rated OCN drama. That same year, Lee was appointed as an honorary member of the police force by South Korea's National Police Agency.

In 2019, Lee once again reprised her lead female role in the third season of Voice.

In 2020, Lee starred in the melodrama A Piece of Your Mind.

Lee again returned for the fourth season of Voice in 2021, making her the lead on all four seasons of the Voice series.

Lee was cast in the 2022 KBS2's family weekend drama Three Bold Siblings, which marked her 4th collaboration with screenwriter Kim In-young, after 2007s Merry Mary, 2008s Women in the Sun and 2015s Unkind Ladies.

Filmography

Television series

Film

Variety show

Music video appearances

Discography

Ambassador
 2009 PR Ambassador of 46th Daejeong Film Awards
 2011 PR Ambassador of Hurb-nanum Campaign (Korea Foundation for Persons with Disabilities)
 2016-2020 PR Ambassador of Seoul
 2018 Honorary Police Officer of the Korean National Police Agency

Awards and nominations

References

External links
 
 
 
 

1982 births
Living people
21st-century South Korean actresses
South Korean television actresses
South Korean film actresses
South Korean guitarists
South Korean composers
21st-century guitarists
Dankook University alumni
People from Seoul
21st-century women guitarists